Anthony Emery may refer to:

Anthony Armstrong Emery, entrepreneur
Anthony Joseph Emery, bishop
Tony Emery, footballer